Grushevaya Polyana is a rural locality (a settlement) in Shubinskoye Rural Settlement, Ostrogozhsky District, Voronezh Oblast, Russia. The population was 276 as of 2010. There are 2 streets.

Geography 
Grushevaya Polyana is located 11 km west of Ostrogozhsk (the district's administrative centre) by road. Gubarevka is the nearest rural locality.

References 

Rural localities in Ostrogozhsky District